William Duff Sr. (July 22, 1842 – February 18, 1913) was a Scottish-born businessman and politician in Newfoundland. He represented Carbonear in the Newfoundland House of Assembly from 1889 to 1900.

He was born in Bothkennar, Stirlingshire and was educated in Falkirk. Duff came to Newfoundland as a clerk for a firm in Harbour Grace. In 1886, he went into business in partnership with Robert Balmer; after Balmer retired, Duff became sole owner. He married Mary Ann Thompson. In 1893, Duff was named governor for the savings bank. He died in Carbonear at the age of 70.

His son William later served in the Canadian House of Commons and in the Canadian Senate.

References 

Members of the Newfoundland and Labrador House of Assembly
1842 births
1913 deaths
People from Falkirk (council area)
Businesspeople from Newfoundland and Labrador
Newfoundland Colony people
Scottish emigrants to pre-Confederation Newfoundland